Nogometno društvo Renkovci, commonly referred to as ND Renkovci or simply Renkovci, is a Slovenian football club which plays in the town of Renkovci. The team was founded in 1978. Renkovci plays in the MNL Lendava, the fifth highest league in Slovenia.

Honours
Slovenian Third League
 Winners: 1999–2000

Slovenian Fourth Division
 Winners: 2003–04

Slovenian Sixth Division
 Winners: 2007–08

References

External links
Weltfussballarchiv profile

Association football clubs established in 1978
Football clubs in Slovenia
1978 establishments in Slovenia